Colonel Henry C. Bradsby, often credited as H.C. Bradsby, was a late 19th-century historian and biographer. Many of his works are extensive local histories of various United States counties in Illinois, Missouri, Indiana and Pennsylvania, several of which totaled more than a thousand pages.

Works
 History of Arkansas
 Battle of Gettysburg
 History of Illinois
 History of Bureau County, Illinois (1885)
 History of Cumberland and Adams Counties, Pennsylvania (1886) with Aaron Sheely, M.A. Leeson, and others
 History of Columbia and Montour Counties, Pennsylvania (1887) with Samuel P. Bates, H.C. Bell, J.H. Battle
 Commemorative Biographical and Historical Record of Kane County, Illinois (1888)
 History of Vigo County, Indiana, with Biographical Selections (1891)
 History of Bradford County, Pennsylvania, with Biographical Selections (1891)
 History of Luzerne County Pennsylvania (1893)

References

American biographers
American male biographers
Historians of the United States
Historians of the American Civil War
Local historians
Year of death missing
American historians
Year of birth missing